The Vereinsthaler (union thaler) was a standard silver coin used in most German states and the Austrian Empire in the years before German unification.

The Vereinsthaler was introduced in 1857 to replace the various versions of the North German thaler, many of which were already set at par with the Prussian thaler. While the earlier Prussian Thaler was slightly heavier at th a Cologne mark of fine silver (16.704 grams), the Vereinsthaler contained  grams of silver, which was indicated on the coins as one thirtieth of a  metric pound (Pfund, equal to 500 grams).

Distribution 

The Vereinsthaler was used as the base for several different currencies. In Prussia and several other northern German states, the Vereinsthaler was the standard unit of account, divided into 30 Silbergroschen, each of 12 Pfennig. See Prussian Vereinsthaler.

In Saxony, the Neugroschen was equal to the Prussian Silbergroschen but was divided into 10 Pfennig. See Saxon Vereinsthaler. Some other north German states, such as Hanover, used the name Groschen rather than Silbergroschen for a coin of 12 Pfennig (see Hanoverian Vereinsthaler), while the Mecklenburg states and Hesse-Kassel (or Hesse-Cassel) used entirely distinct subdivisions; see Mecklenburg Vereinsthaler and Hesse-Kassel Vereinsthaler.

In southern Germany, states including Bavaria used the South German gulden as the standard unit of account, with  Gulden = 1 Vereinsthaler. The Gulden was divided into 60 Kreuzer, each of 4 Pfennig or 8 Heller. These states issued Vereinsmünze (union coinage) worth 1 and 2 Vereinsthaler, or 1 and 3 gulden. See Bavarian Gulden, Baden Gulden, Württemberg Gulden.

In the Austrian Empire (and later the Austro-Hungarian Empire), a different florin (known as the Gulden in German or forint in Hungarian) was the unit of account, with  florins = 1 Vereinsthaler. The florin was divided into 100 kreutzers.

Withdrawal 
Following German unification in 1871, the Goldmark was introduced in 1873 at a rate of 3 mark = 1 Vereinsthaler. Consequently, the new 10 pfennig coins were equivalent to the old Groschen of northern Germany and this became a nickname for the denomination.

Unlike subsidiary silver coins of the goldmark with a legal tender limit of 20 marks, all silver 3-mark Vereinsthalers issued before 1871 enjoyed unlimited legal tender status even after the switchover to the gold standard. This ended with the demonetization of the Vereinsthaler in 1908 and the minting of new, smaller subsidiary 3-mark coins. The name Thaler for 3 marks persisted until the 1930s.

Austria-Hungary stopped issuing Vereinsthaler coins in 1867, following the Austro-Prussian War.

References

Currencies of Austria
Currencies of Germany
Modern obsolete currencies